The Calabi triangle is a special triangle found by Eugenio Calabi and defined by its property of having three different placements for the largest square that it contains. It is an isosceles triangle which is obtuse with an irrational but algebraic ratio between the lengths of its sides and its base.

Definition
Consider the largest square that can be placed in an arbitrary triangle. It may be that such a square could be positioned in the triangle in more than one way. If the largest such square can be positioned in three different ways, then the triangle is either an equilateral triangle or the Calabi triangle. Thus, the Calabi triangle may be defined as a triangle that is not equilateral and has three placements for its largest square.

Shape
The Calabi triangle is isosceles. The ratio of the base to either leg is
 
This value can also be expressed without complex numbers by using trigonometric functions:
 
It is the largest positive root of
 
and has continued fraction representation [1, 1, 1, 4, 2, 1, 2, 1, 5, 2, 1, 3, 1, 1, 390, ...].

The Calabi triangle is obtuse with base angles 39.1320261...° and third angle 101.7359477...°.

See also 
Biggest little polygon

References 
  

Types of triangles